Queen's Hall was a concert hall in London, destroyed in World War II.

Queen's Hall may also refer to:

Australia
Queen's Hall, Adelaide, South Australia, a former theatre
Queen's Hall, Melbourne, Victoria, a former theatre (1920–1937)

United Kingdom
Queen's Hall, Edinburgh, Scotland
Queen's Hall, Hexham, Northumberland, England, now an arts centre
Queen's Hall, Minehead, Somerset, England
Queens Hall, Leeds,  England (1961–1989)